Molly Rose Gray (born March 18, 1984) is an American attorney and politician who served as the 83rd lieutenant governor of Vermont from 2021 to 2023. A member of the Democratic Party, she was an assistant attorney general for Vermont from 2018 to 2021.

A native of Newbury, Vermont, Gray graduated from the University of Vermont (BA, 2006), Vermont Law School (JD, 2014), and the Graduate Institute of International and Development Studies (LLM, 2016). While in college, she interned in U.S. Senator Patrick Leahy's Burlington office. She was active in Peter Welch's successful 2006 U.S. House campaign, then joined his staff after he took office in 2007. Gray subsequently worked on human rights issues for the International Committee of the Red Cross. After law school, she worked for the International Code of Conduct for Private Security Service Providers, an organization created to monitor the human rights compliance of private security contractors.

In August 2018, Gray was appointed an assistant state attorney general in the Vermont Attorney General's Criminal Division. She also taught at Vermont Law School, her courses centered primarily on international human rights law. In early 2020, Gray announced her candidacy for lieutenant governor. In the August primary, she defeated better-known state senators Tim Ashe and Debbie Ingram for the Democratic nomination. In the November general election, she defeated Republican nominee Scott Milne, 51.3% to 44.2%, becoming the first Democrat to hold the office since Doug Racine left office in 2003.

In 2022, Gray ran for the U.S. House of Representatives, seeking to represent Vermont's at-large congressional district. She lost the Democratic primary election to Becca Balint.

Early life and education
Gray was born in Newbury, Vermont, on March 18, 1984. Her father, Bob Gray, competed in the 1968 Winter Olympics and 1972 Winter Olympics as a cross-country skier. Her mother, Kim Mumford, was an alpine skier who was prevented by injury from qualifying for the Olympics. Her uncle, William B. Gray, was the United States Attorney for Vermont. Bob and Kim Gray raised Molly and her two siblings on a  vegetable and dairy farm in Newbury. The farm is still owned and operated by the Gray family.

Gray attended the schools of Newbury and Bradford's Oxbow High School, and graduated from Stratton Mountain School in 2002. She studied at the University of Vermont (UVM) on an athletic scholarship and competed for the Vermont Catamounts in cross-country skiing. Gray earned a Bachelor of Arts degree in area and international studies from UVM in 2006 and a Juris Doctor from Vermont Law School (VLS) in 2014. While at VLS, Gray served as symposium editor for the Vermont Journal of Environmental Law. She also co-chaired the VLS International Law Society. She earned a Master of Laws in international law from the Graduate Institute of International and Development Studies in 2016.

Early career 
While in college, Gray served as an intern in Patrick Leahy's Vermont office. She then worked on Peter Welch's 2006 campaign for the U.S. House of Representatives, and became a member of his Congressional staff after he was elected. She later worked for the International Committee of the Red Cross, where she engaged the U.S. government on humanitarian issues and led field missions to Haiti, Uganda, Georgia, the Western Balkans, and the Democratic Republic of the Congo.

Gray graduated from Vermont Law School in 2014 and worked as a law clerk for Judge Peter W. Hall of the United States Court of Appeals for the Second Circuit. In August 2018, state Attorney General T. J. Donovan hired her as an assistant attorney general in the Criminal Division. Gray has taught courses at Vermont Law School, with her instruction focused on international human rights law.

Political career

2020 Vermont elections

Gray announced her campaign for lieutenant governor in early 2020. She defeated Tim Ashe and Debbie Ingram in the Democratic primary on August 11, 2020. Gray faced Republican businessman Scott Milne in the November 3 general election. One major campaign issue was whether Gray met the four-year residency requirement the state constitution mandates for the lieutenant governor; most legal and political observers agreed that she did. A related issue was that Gray had not voted between 2008 and 2018. Milne also admitted to not having voted in some elections, but characterized himself as a consistent voter and Gray as an inconsistent one. Gray won the election with 51.3% of the vote.

Lieutenant governor
Gray took office in January 2021, becoming the fourth woman to serve as Vermont's lieutenant governor and the first Democrat to hold the office in 18 years. Within months of taking office, she hired a nearly full-time political staffer. While Gray has a chief of staff in the lieutenant governor's office to aid with official duties, she said she had also hired a full-time political assistant to aid her in keeping "a clear distinction between official work and political things that may come up from time to time". Some Vermont political observers suggested Gray was a likely candidate for the U.S. Senate or U.S. House. Gray discounted such speculation, saying she was focused on her work as lieutenant governor.

As lieutenant governor, Gray virtually hosted classrooms at the Vermont State House so schoolchildren could experience being "lieutenant governor for a day". Through her "Seat at the Table" meeting series, she met with local leaders to discuss issues facing Vermont, from equity in access to health care and broadband to women's economic well-being and how to tackle climate change. She toured the state throughout 2021, visiting all 14 counties for her "Recover Stronger" initiative.

U.S. House campaign
In December 2021, Gray announced her candidacy for Vermont's at-large congressional district in the United States House of Representatives in 2022. The seat has been held by Peter Welch, who in November announced his candidacy for the United States Senate seat of Patrick Leahy. Leahy announced earlier in November that he would not seek reelection in 2022. Gray was endorsed by former Vermont Governors Madeleine Kunin and Howard Dean, as well as Marcelle Leahy, Senator Leahy's wife. Senator Leahy voted for Gray, but declined to formally endorse her.

Gray was both praised and criticized for announcing her run for Congress less than a year after taking her first public office. She lost the Democratic primary to Becca Balint, the president pro tempore of the Vermont Senate, 59.6% to 36.4%.

Electoral history

Personal life
On August 29, 2021, Gray announced that she had married airline pilot Michael David Palm. According to Gray, they met in Burlington after being introduced by mutual friends. The wedding took place at the Gray family farm in Newbury.

References

External links

Molly Gray for Congress campaign website

21st-century American lawyers
21st-century American politicians
21st-century American women lawyers
21st-century American women politicians
1984 births
American expatriates in Switzerland
Candidates in the 2022 United States House of Representatives elections
Graduate Institute of International and Development Studies alumni
Lieutenant Governors of Vermont
Living people
People from Newbury, Vermont
Vermont Catamounts skiers
Vermont Democrats
Vermont lawyers
Vermont Law and Graduate School alumni
Women in Vermont politics